The Spike may refer to:

 The Spike (1980), a novel by Arnaud de Borchgrave and Robert Moss
 The Spike (1997), a nonfiction book by Damien Broderick
 "The Spike" (essay) by George Orwell
 The Spike (TV series), a controversial 1978 Irish television drama
 "The Spike" (song), a 2008 song for The Music
 The Spire of Dublin